The 2019 Cooper Tires USF2000 Championship was the tenth season – since its revival in 2010 – of the U.S. F2000 National Championship, an open wheel auto racing series that is the first step in INDYCAR's Road to Indy ladder, operated by Andersen Promotions. A 15-race schedule was announced on September 25, 2018, consisting of five permanent road courses and two street circuits on the NTT IndyCar Series schedule each hosting doubleheaders, and a single race at the Dave Steele Classic on a short oval.

American Braden Eves of Cape Motorsports won the championship in a tightly contested points race by winning the final race at WeatherTech Raceway Laguna Seca over New Zealander Hunter McElrea of Pabst Racing. Eves won six times with two other podium finishes while McElrea, who had won the Road to Indy Shootout to earn his place on the U.S. F2000 grid, won four times with eight other podiums. Danish driver Christian Rasmussen won three races and finished tied for the third most points with American Colin Kaminsky. Rasmussen won third by virtue of Kaminsky not capturing any race wins. Darren Keane won one race and finished fifth in the championship. Australian Cameron Shields, who ended his championship campaign after the Toronto round, was the sole other race winner on the season.

Pabst Racing won its third straight team championship despite their top driver McElrea losing out on the drivers' championship.

Drivers and teams

Schedule

Race results

Championship standings
Scoring system

 One point is awarded to the driver who qualifies on pole position.
 One point is awarded to the driver who leads the most laps in the race.
 One point is awarded to the driver who sets the fastest lap during the race.

Drivers' Championship

Teams' championship
Scoring system

Single car teams receive 3 bonus points as an equivalency to multi-car teams

Only the best two results count for teams fielding more than two entries

See also
2019 IndyCar Series
2019 Indy Lights
2019 Indy Pro 2000 Championship

References

External links
 

US F2000 National Championship
U.S. F2000 National Championship